Francis Gerard Connell (13 January 1902 – 16 March 1983) was an Irish cricketer. A right-handed batsman, he made his debut for Ireland in August 1934 against the MCC. He went on to play for Ireland on 11 occasions, his last match coming in July 1938, also against the MCC. Five of his matches for Ireland had first-class status.

References

1902 births
1983 deaths
Irish cricketers
Cricketers from Dublin (city)